Marline Valley Woods is a  biological Site of Special Scientific Interest on the western outskirts of Hastings in East Sussex.

This site has ancient woodland and species rich unimproved grassland. The wood has standards of pedunculate oak and coppice of hornbeam, hazel and sweet chestnut. A stream runs along a steep sided valley which has 61 species of mosses and liverworts, including some uncommon species.

There is access from Queensway.

References

Local Nature Reserves in East Sussex
Sussex Wildlife Trust
Sites of Special Scientific Interest in East Sussex
Hastings